This is the discography of German rapper Bushido, who has sold more than 1.5 million records in Germany alone, as of 2009. He has earned fifteen gold and three platinum certifications for his records.

He has released throughout his 14 studio albums, 4 live albums, 7 compilation albums, 5 collaboration albums, 5 underground releases and 56 singles in total (31 solo singles, 8 collaboration singles, 15 as featured artist).

Albums

Studio albums

Collaborative albums

Compilation albums

Live albums

Demos

Singles

As lead artist

As featured artist

Other charted songs

Guest appearances

Music videos

 2006: Augenblick
 2006: Gheddo (feat. Eko Fresh)
 2006: Von der Skyline zum Bordstein zurück
 2006: Sonnenbank Flavour
 2006: Vendetta (feat. Eko Fresh & Chakuza)
 2007: Geben & nehmen (feat. Nyze, Chakuza)
 2007: Janine
 2007: Ring frei (feat. Eko Fresh)
 2007: Eure Kinder (feat. Chakuza)
 2007: Alles verloren
 2007: Reich mir nicht deine Hand
 2007: Alles Gute kommt von unten (feat. Chakuza, Kay One)
 2008: Unter der Sonne (feat. Chakuza)
 2008: Regen (feat. Saad)
 2008: Ching Ching
 2008: Für immer jung (feat. Karel Gott)
 2009: Kennst du die Stars? (feat. Oliver Pocher)
 2009: Ein letztes Mal (feat. Nyze)
 2009: Eine Chance/Zu Gangsta (with Fler)
 2010: Alles wird gut
 2010: Style und das Geld (feat. Kay One)
 2010: Das alles ist Deutschland (feat. Fler)
 2010: Zeiten ändern dich
 2010: Berlins Most Wanted (with Fler, Kay One)
 2010: Weg eines Kriegers (with Fler, Kay One)
 2010: Für immer jung (feat. Karel Gott) (2010 Version)
 2011: Vergiss mich (feat. J-Luv)
 2011: Wärst du immer noch hier?
 2011: So mach ich es (with Sido)
 2011: Erwachsen sein (with Sido feat. Peter Maffay)
 2012: Intro
 2012: Kleine Bushidos
 2012: Theorie & Praxis (feat. JokA)
 2013: Panamera Flow (feat. Shindy)
 2013: Stress ohne Grund (feat. Shindy)
 2013: 30-11-80 (feat. Various Artists)
 2013: Leben und Tod des kenneth Glöckler
 2013: Mitten in der Nacht
 2014: Gangsta Rap Kings (feat. Kollegah & Farid Bang)
 2014: Jeder meiner Freunde

Notes

References

Hip hop discographies
Discographies of German artists